Bissa (or Bisa (singular), Bisan, Bissanno (plural)), is a Mande ethnic group of south-central Burkina Faso, northeastern Ghana and the northernmost tip of Togo. Their language, Bissa, is a Mande language that is related to, but not the same as, a cluster of languages in the old Borgu Kingdom area of Northeast Benin and Northwest Nigeria, including Busa, Boko, and Kyenga. An alternate name for the Bissa is Busansi which is used by the Mossi people or Busanga.

Daniel McFarland's Historical Dictionary of Upper Volta refers to them as "intrusive Mande who settled the area along the White Volta below Tenkodogo by 1300. Some live across the border in modern northern Ghana and Togo. According to some traditions, Rialle, progenitor of the Nakomse line of Mossi rulers was Busansi."

They are known for their cultivation of peanuts. Traditionally, a Bissa man who wants to court a Bissa girl must work in her mother's peanut field, and be able to provide the girl with her own peanut field if they get married.
The Bissa are divided in three language groups, that is the Barka, the Lebir and the Lere.  They are further divided into several clans.  Each clan has a name and an appellation normally called dedaa by the Bissa. The appellation is now used as a surname in Burkina Faso.

Some Bissa live in Ivory Coast.

Names 
The name is usually spelled Bissa. It can also be spelled Bisa, and the name in the Mossi language is Busansi (Singular) or Busanga (Plural); This should not be confused with the Bisa language of Zambia or the Busa language of Nigeria and Benin.

Geographic distribution 
In Burkina Faso, Bissa is spoken in Boulgou, Koulpélogo, and Kouritenga Provinces of the Centre-Est Region, in Bazaga and Zoundwéogo Provinces of the Centre–Sud Region (Garango, Gomboussougou, Zabré, and Tenkodogo Cities), and in the Boudry Department of Ganzargou Province of the Plateau-Central Region.

In Ghana, Bissa is spoken in Bawku Municipal District of the Upper East Region.

In Togo, Bissa is spoken in Tône Prefecture of the Savanes Region. There are also some Bissa speakers in Ivory Coast.

Classification 
Bissa language is the most populous of the Mande languages of Ghana and Togo. It is part of the Eastern Mande group, which also includes several other languages spoken across the Volta River and the Borgu Kingdom, including Boko, Busa, Samo, and Bokobaru.

Dialects 
Bissa has three dialect:
Barka or Baraka (also known as Eastern Bissa)
Lebir or Zeba (also known as Western Bissa)
Lere (also known as Northern Bissa)
The most widely spoken dialects of Bissa are Barka and Lebir.

To the East the Bissa people speak Barka/Baraka. To The West people speak Lebir/Zeba. To the North the Lere dialect is used. To the South, there is no specifics dialect.

Writing System 
High tone is marked with an Acute accent and low tone is marked with a Grave accent. The following is the alphabet of the Lere and Lebir dialects of Bissa:

The following is the alphabet of the Barka dialect of Bissa:

Comparison of dialects

Lere phrases 
 Good morning: Domireh ki (Response: Domireh zain)
 Good afternoon: Sundareh ki (Response: Sundareh zain)
 Good evening/night: Yirbaa ki (Response: Yirbaa zain)
 Thank you: Barka
 Good: Minga
 Come: Bur
 Go: Ta
 You're welcome: An barka boi
 I love you: Moi wam

The Busa and Boko peoples of Benin and Nigeria 
The Busa and Boko peoples, two subgroups of the Bissa people, live in Northwestern Nigeria and Northern Benin near Borgu in the Nigerian States of Niger, Kebbi and Kwara (mostly Bokobaru subgroup) and in the Beninese Departments of Alibori and Borgou.

They speak Busa (also known as Bisã) and Boko (also known as Boo). This peoples are referred to as Bussawa in Hausa.

Some notable clans and Appellations of the Bissa Tribe 

The Bissa people are divided into numerous clans. Their language differs slightly; dialects are Barka, Lere, and Lebir.

Most Bissa are Muslim. The Bissa of the Garango Circle are among the most representative of the north. The Garango township, which forms the center of the northern Bissa, remained independent, while the northwestern districts were under the tutelage of the Mossi kingdom of Ouagadougou and the northeastern townships under the supervision of the Mossi kingdom of Tenkodogo. In Accra, Ghana, some of the established and notable towns are Busanga line in the North Kaneshie area of the Okai Koi constituency. Other towns noted for their Bissa people are Town Council line or Lartebiokorshie and shukura in the Ablekuma central constituency, and Nima in Ayawaso central constituency.
In Bissa's tribes, Lingani's are the holder of both the political power and the mystical power. The person that hold the power is not the one with the crown but the one that gives the crown. No one can access to the power and wear the crown prior being mystically prepared by the Lingani's in Tangaré village of Garango in the province of Boulgou (Burkina Faso). The Lingani's are hunters and the ceremonial fig tree with their ancestors centenary hunting spear is still visible today near Tangaré mountain facing Lingani's familial house. Bissas live with their dead ancestors buried in front of their houses in order to honor them. Bissa burial sites are  dug in shape of  traditional building but underground with a small hole for the body entrance and the person that receives the body to lay him for rest. Several people can be buried in the same familial grave. The grave entrance is covered with a clay vase that can be removed for future burial. Barso the ancestor of the Bissas was a hunter.
NOTE.
Is From Bissa Bissam Baa Kamaji house.

See also 
 Busa language (Mande)
 Boko language
 Kyenga language
 Shanga language

References

Sources 
 , the SIL entry direct towards 

Mande languages
Languages of Burkina Faso
Languages of Ghana
Languages of Togo
Languages of Ivory Coast